Neoconocephalus bivocatus, the false robust conehead, is a species of conehead in the family Tettigoniidae. It is found in North America.

References

bivocatus
Articles created by Qbugbot
Insects described in 1973